The Taconic Skyline Trail is a  multi-use trail in the Taconic Mountains of Berkshire County, Massachusetts.

Originally built as a hiking trail, the Taconic Skyline Trail sees heavy use by all-terrain vehicles and snowmobiles and is now officially maintained for primarily motorized use. The trail is used less frequently for mountain biking but is no longer recommended for hikers, who are encouraged to use the parallel, non-motorized Taconic Crest Trail. However, the trail is still open to hikers. Recent grants through the Massachusetts DCR's Commonwealth Connections project have provided 40,000 dollars to ATV clubs for trail surface rehabilitation.  

Forest types the Taconic Skyline Trail are mixed oak-hickory forest and northern hardwood forest with alkaline-loving plant communities, and red spruce/ balsam fir stands on the higher summits. The geology is thrust faulted metamorphic rock over younger sedimentary rock.

Trail details
In the late 1990s, the southern section from Route 41 to Route 20 was officially closed, as was the northern section over the remaining 2/3 of Brodie Mountain. Unsanctioned use of these sections still occurs, however.

Features along the trail include the highland Cranberry Pond and Twin Ponds, Doll Mountain, Smith Mountain, Tower Mountain, Berry Pond,  (reputed the highest pond in Massachusetts), Poppy Mountain, Jiminy Peak, and Widow White's Peak. A state campground is located at Berry Pond.

See also
The Appalachian Trail
Taconic Trails

References
Massachusetts Trail Guide (2004). Boston: Appalachian Mountain Club.
Commonwealth Connections proposal PDF download. Retrieved March 2, 2008.
AMC Massachusetts and Rhode Island Trail Guide (1989). Boston: Appalachian Mountain Club.
"Greenways and Trails" Massachusetts DCR. Retrieved February 22, 2008.

External links
Pittsfield State Forest map
Pittsfield State Forest. Massachusetts DCR.

Protected areas of Berkshire County, Massachusetts
Hiking trails in Massachusetts
Taconic Mountains
Civilian Conservation Corps in Massachusetts